The 1991–92 FA Cup was the 111th season of the world's oldest knockout football competition, The Football Association Challenge Cup, or FA Cup for short.  Liverpool beat Sunderland 2–0 in the final to take their 5th FA Cup trophy.

The appearance in the Cup Final of Sunderland, a Level 2 team, marked the first time in 10 years that a team outside Level 1 of the English football pyramid appeared in the final game.  Sunderland is one of only eight non-Level 1 teams to win the FA Cup, a mark they achieved in the 1973 FA Cup Final.

This was the first FA Cup competition to use penalties to decide games still tied after extra time in a replayed match.

First round proper

Grimsby Town and Tranmere Rovers from the Football League Second Division entered in this round along with all the Football League Third and Fourth Division teams plus three non-league clubs were given byes to this round: Wycombe Wanderers, Kidderminster Harriers and Woking. The first round matches were played on the weekend between 15 and 17 November 1991, with replays played midweek between 26 and 27 November. The tie between Huddersfield Town and Lincoln United was the largest gap in league places between two teams in the FA Cup until Marine and Tottenham Hotspur during the 2020-21 FA Cup.

Second round proper

The second round matches were played on the weekend between 7–9 December 1991, with replays played midweek on 17 December.

Third round proper

Teams from the Football League First and Second Division (except Grimsby and Tranmere) entered in this round. The third round matches were played on the weekend between 4–6 January 1992, with replays played midweek between 14 and 15 January. However, the Newcastle United-Bournemouth match was replayed on 22 January, while the Derby County-Burnley match was replayed on 25 January.

Fourth round proper

The fourth round matches were played on the weekend between 25 and 27 January 1992, with replays played midweek between 4–5 February. However, the Bristol Rovers-Liverpool match was played on 5 February, and replayed on 11 February.

Fifth round proper

The fifth round matches were played on the weekend between 15 and 16 February 1992, with replays played midweek on 26 February.

Sixth round proper

The sixth round matches were played on the weekend beginning 7–8 March 1992, with replays being played on 18 March.

Liverpool began to compensate for a sub-standard league season by eliminating Aston Villa and booking themselves a seemingly easy semi-final tie with a Portsmouth side who defeated League Cup finalists Nottingham Forest and ending their hopes of a unique FA Cup/League Cup double.

Norwich City reached the semi-finals for the second time in four seasons after beating Southampton in a replay.

Sunderland joined fellow Second Division side Portsmouth in the FA Cup semi-finals thanks to a 2–1 replay win over Chelsea after a 1–1 draw.

Replays

Semi-finals

The semi-finals were played on 5 April 1992. It was the first time that Hillsborough was used as a semi-final venue since the Hillsborough Disaster at a previous FA Cup semi-final in 1989. This time it was Second Division Sunderland and First Division Norwich City who were competing for a place in the final. Sunderland went through with John Byrne scoring the only goal of the game to take the Wearsiders to their first cup final since 1973.

Portsmouth held Liverpool to a 1–1 draw in the other semi-final at Highbury, with the replay being held at Villa Park, which went to penalties after a goalless draw. Liverpool emerged as victors in the shootout to reach the FA Cup final for the fourth time in seven seasons.

Replay

Liverpool won 3–1 on penalties

Final

Liverpool won the FA Cup for the fifth time with a 2–0 victory to compensate for their worst league season (sixth place) for more than 20 years. Ian Rush scored his fifth goal in FA Cup Finals, a record.

Media coverage
For the fourth consecutive season in the United Kingdom, the BBC was the free to air broadcaster.  For the first full season following its absorption of BSB's Sports Channel, Sky Sports was the subscription broadcaster.

The live matches on the BBC were: Leeds United vs Manchester United (R3); Chelsea vs Everton (R4); Swindon Town vs Aston Villa (R5); Liverpool vs Aston Villa (QF); both Liverpool vs Portsmouth and Norwich City vs Sunderland (SF); and Sunderland vs Liverpool (Final).

The third round match between Leeds United and Manchester United was postponed and shown live on the Wednesday evening initially intended for replays.  On the original day, the BBC showed instead extended coverage of Aston Villa vs Tottenham Hotspur which had been played earlier in the day and shown live on Sky Sports.

References

External links
The FA Cup at TheFA.com
FA Cup at BBC.co.uk
FA Cup news at Reuters.co.uk

 
FA Cup seasons
Fa Cup, 1991-92
1991–92 domestic association football cups